Guntram (Op. 25) is an opera in three acts by Richard Strauss with a German libretto written by the composer. The second act of the opera was composed in Ramacca, Sicily.

It was Strauss' first opera and shows a strong Wagnerian influence. The music of Guntram is quoted in Strauss's tone poem Ein Heldenleben. The composer revised the score in 1940.

Performance history
The opera was not very successful, and was only staged a few times during Strauss' lifetime:

The first performance took place on 10 May 1894 at the Grossherzogliches Hoftheater in Weimar. The soprano role of Freihild was sung by Pauline de Ahna, Strauss's future wife. Later performances conducted by Strauss included those in Munich on 16 November 1895 and in Prague on 9 October 1901. A performance in Frankfurt was given on 9 March 1910 conducted by Ludwig Rottenberg.

In Hamburg, on 4 February 1895, Gustav Mahler included the prelude to act 1 in his 6th Philharmonic Concert. He included the preludes to acts 1 and 2 in a concert in Vienna on 19 February 1899, and in New York City on 30 March 1910 with the New York Philharmonic.

Roles

Synopsis
Set in medieval Germany, the triangular Wagnerian-style story of love and redemption is about the minstrel Guntram, the evil Duke Robert and his saintly wife Freihild. (The story is not connected with the Merovingian king Guntram of Burgundy.)

Recordings

References

Further reading

External links

Richard Strauss works, Operone.de

Operas
German-language operas
Operas by Richard Strauss
1894 operas
Operas set in Germany